Manchester by the Sea is a 2016 American drama film written and directed by Kenneth Lonergan. Starring Casey Affleck, Michelle Williams, Kyle Chandler and Lucas Hedges, the film focuses on the uncle who has to look after his teenage nephew after the boy's father dies. The film premiered at the Sundance Film Festival on January 23, 2016 and began a limited release on November 18, 2016, before going wide on December 16, 2016. The film was released to universal acclaim, with Rotten Tomatoes gave an approval rating of 96%, based on 356 reviews, with an average rating of 8.8/10 and Metacritic gave a score of 96 out of 100, based on 53 reviews.

Manchester by the Sea won Best Actor for Affleck and Best Original Screenplay and nominated for Best Picture, Best Supporting Actor for Hedges, Best Supporting Actress for Williams and Best Director at Academy Awards. The film won Best Actor in a Leading Role for Affleck and Best Original Screenplay and nominated for Best Film, Best Actress in a Supporting Role for Williams, Best Direction and Best Editing at British Academy Film Awards. The film won Best Actor for Affleck, Best Young Performer for Hedges and Best Original Screenplay and nominated for Best Picture, Best Director, Best Supporting Actor for Hedges, Best Supporting Actress for Williams and Best Acting Ensemble at Critics' Choice Awards. The film won Best Actor – Motion Picture Drama for Affleck and nominated for Best Motion Picture – Drama, Best Supporting Actress – Motion Picture for Williams, Best Director and Best Screenplay at Golden Globe Awards. The film won Best Film and Best Director and nominated for Best Actor for Affleck, Best Supporting Actor for Hedges, Best Supporting Actress for Williams, Best Original Screenplay and Best Original Score at Satellite Awards.

Accolades

Notes

References

External links 
 

Lists of accolades by film